Hsieh Su-wei was the defending champion, but lost to Nao Hibino in the quarterfinals.

Hibino went on to win the title, defeating Misaki Doi in the final, 6–3, 6–2.

Seeds

Draw

Finals

Top half

Bottom half

Qualifying

Seeds

Qualifiers

Draw

First qualifier

Second qualifier

Third qualifier

Fourth qualifier

Fifth qualifier

Sixth qualifier

References

External Links
Main Draw
Qualifying Draw

Japan Women's Open - Women's Singles
2019 Women's Singles
2019 Japan Women's Open